Leptostylus aspiciens is a species of longhorn beetles of the subfamily Lamiinae. It was described by Henry Walter Bates in 1885, and is known from Mexico and Honduras.

References

Leptostylus
Beetles described in 1885